Inherit the Viper is a 2019 American crime drama film directed by Anthony Jerjen, in his feature directorial debut, from a screenplay by Andrew Crabtree. It stars Josh Hartnett, Margarita Levieva, Chandler Riggs, Bruce Dern, Valorie Curry, Owen Teague, and Dash Mihok.

Inherit the Viper had its world premiere at the 2019 Zurich Film Festival, and was released in a limited theatrical engagement before premiering on video-on-demand on January 10, 2020, by Lionsgate.

Plot
For siblings Kip and Josie, dealing opioids is not just their family business, it is their only means of survival. When a deal goes fatally wrong, Kip decides he wants out for good. But his attempt to escape his family's legacy soon ignites a powder keg of violence and betrayal, endangering Kip, Josie, and their younger brother.

Cast
 Josh Hartnett as Kip Conley
 Margarita Levieva as Josie Conley
 Chandler Riggs as Cooper
 Bruce Dern as Clay Carter
 Valorie Curry as Eve
 Owen Teague as Boots Conley
 Artrial Clark as Boots' Friend
 Dash Mihok as Kyle Knox
 Brad William Henke as Tedd Wallace
 Jared Bankens as Marcus
 Blaine Kern III as Ryan
 Tara Buck as Eliza
 G-Rod as Duane
 Garrett Kruithof as Packard

Production
In November 2017, it was announced Josh Hartnett and Margarita Levieva joined the cast of the film, with Anthony Jerjen directing from a screenplay written by Anthony Crabtree. While Michel Merkt and Benito Mueller produced the film, Wolfgang Mueller served as an executive producer under their Barry Films banner. In December 2017, Bruce Dern, Owen Teague, Valorie Curry, Chandler Riggs and Dash Mihok joined the cast of the film.

Principal photography began in December 2017.

Reception

References

External links

2019 films
American crime drama films
American thriller drama films
2010s English-language films
2010s American films